"That Don't Sound Like You" is a song co-written and recorded by American country music artist Lee Brice. It was released in May 2015 as the third single from his third studio album I Don't Dance.  The song was written by Brice, Rhett Akins and Ashley Gorley.

Content
The song is about a man calling a former lover, realizing that her new man has "stripped her of her fun-loving identity".

Music video
The music video was directed by Ryan Smith and premiered in June 2015.

Chart performance
The song has sold 333,000 copies in the United States as of May 2016. On October 18, 2017, the song was certified gold by the RIAA.

Year-end charts

References

2014 songs
2015 singles
Lee Brice songs
Curb Records singles
Songs written by Lee Brice
Songs written by Rhett Akins
Songs written by Ashley Gorley
Country ballads